Khosrowabad (also Romanized as Khosrowābād; also known as Tang-e Khosrowābād and Tang-i-Khusrauābād) is a village in Kunani Rural District, Kunani District, Kuhdasht County, Lorestan Province, Iran. At the 2006 census, its population was 672, in 130 families.

References 

Towns and villages in Kuhdasht County